Mean airway pressure typically refers to the mean pressure applied during positive-pressure mechanical ventilation.  Mean airway pressure correlates with alveolar ventilation, arterial oxygenation, 

hemodynamic performance, and barotrauma. It can also match the alveolar pressure if there is no difference between inspiratory and expiratory resistance.

Equations 
There are several equations aimed at determining the real mean airway pressure.

Volume control ventilation 
In ventilation with a square flow waveform this equation can be used:

where:

  = mean airway pressure
 = peak inspiratory pressure
 = peak end expiratory pressure
 = inspiratory time
 = cycle time

Pressure control ventilation 
During pressure control ventilation this variant of the equation can be used:

where:

  = mean airway pressure
 = peak inspiratory pressure
 = peak end expiratory pressure
 = inspiratory time
 = cycle time

Airway pressure release ventilation 

In airway pressure release ventilation (APRV) a variation of the previous equation must be used for the variables:

where:
 = mean airway pressure
 = peak inspiratory pressure (PIP)
 = peak end expiratory pressure
 = time spent at 
 = time spent at

Other equations

Clinical significance 
Mean airway pressure has been shown to have a similar correlation as plateau pressure to mortality. 

MAP is closely associated with mean alveolar pressure and shows the stresses exerted on the lung parenchyma on mechanical ventilation.

In high frequency oscillatory ventilation, it has been suggested to set the mean airway pressure six above the lower inflection point on the lungs P-V curve.

See also 

 Ventilators
 Mechanical ventilation
 Modes of ventilation

References

Mechanical ventilation